Annapoorani, popularly known as Poorni, is a VJ, actress and software engineer from Tamil Nadu.

Early life and family

Poorni was born in Madurai to a Tamil family from Dindigul.

Education

Poorni holds an engineering degree from the Shanmugha Arts, Science, Technology & Research Academy in Tanjore.

Small screen career

Poorni started off hosting shows in Sun Music. Later appeared for many channels Vasanth TV, Mega TV,Captain TV, Raj Music. She also acted in a serial called Mama Mapila, a Comedy Serial in Sun TV and was featured on Ananda Vikatan, Kumgumam, Surya Kathir Magazines. She also did a few AD films. She won Miss Chinnathirai 2010 in the Miss Photogenic category.

Acting career

Poorni debuted in the film Boss Engira Bhaskaran released in 2010 in a major supporting role alongside popular actors Arya and Santhanam. Her portrayal as a blind teacher was appreciated by critics.

Present job

Other than acting and hosting TV shows, Poorni is a software engineer by profession.

Television

Filmography

References

Living people
Indian film actresses
Indian television actresses
Indian VJs (media personalities)
Actresses in Tamil television
Year of birth missing (living people)